Cofrentes (Valencian: Cofrents) is a town in the province of Valencia.

 

There is a nuclear power plant in Cofrentes.

References

External links
Official site

Municipalities in the Province of Valencia
Valle de Cofrentes